The second season of the American television medical drama Grey's Anatomy commenced airing on the American Broadcasting Company (ABC) on September 25, 2005, and concluded on May 15, 2006. The season was produced by Touchstone Television, in association with Shondaland production company and The Mark Gordon Company, the showrunner being Shonda Rhimes. Actors Ellen Pompeo, Sandra Oh, Katherine Heigl, Justin Chambers, and T. R. Knight reprised their roles as surgical interns Meredith Grey, Cristina Yang, Izzie Stevens, Alex Karev, and George O'Malley respectively. Previous main cast members Chandra Wilson, James Pickens, Jr., Isaiah Washington and Patrick Dempsey also returned, while Kate Walsh, who began the season in a recurring capacity, was promoted to series-regular status, after appearing in 7 episodes as a guest-star.

The season continued to focus on the surgical residency of five young interns as they try to balance the challenges of their competitive careers with the difficulties that determine their personal lives. It was set in the fictional Seattle Grace Hospital, located in the city of Seattle, Washington. Whereas the first season put the emphasis mainly on the unexpected impact the surgical field has on the main characters, the second season provides a detailed perspective on the personal background of each character, focusing on the consequences that their decisions have on their careers. Throughout the season, new storylines were introduced, including the love-triangle between Meredith Grey, Derek Shepherd, and Addison Montgomery, this being the main arc of the season. Also heavily developed was the storyline involving Izzie Stevens' relationship with patient Denny Duquette, which resulted in high critical acclaim and positive fan response.

The season kept its original airtime from the previous season, taking over Boston Legal time slot at 10:00 pm on Sundays, while airing as a lead-out to the already-successful ABC series, Desperate Housewives. It contained 27 episodes, out of which 4 were originally produced for the first season. In addition to the regular episodes, 2 clip shows recapped previous events of the show, both narrated by Steven W. Bailey in his recently introduced role as Joe the Bartender. "Straight to Heart" aired 1 week before the winter-holiday hiatus ended, recapping the most memorable events of the first season and the first-half of the second. "Under Pressure" aired before the twenty-third episode. The season finale was conceived as a 3-part story-arc, the first of this kind in the series, and was scheduled to air on 2 consecutive nights.

The show ended its second season with 21.07 million total viewers and a 6.9 ratings share in the 18–49 demographic. The season opened to high critical acclaim, as most agreed on a significant improvement in storylines. The season saw numerous cast and crew members receive awards and nominations at ceremonies like the 58th Primetime Emmy Awards and the 64th Golden Globe Awards. Katherine Heigl and Chandra Wilson were the cast members with the most nominations for their portrayals of Izzie Stevens and Miranda Bailey, respectively. The series was chosen in the top 10 for several 2006 "best of television" lists, including USA Today, San Jose Mercury News, TV Guide, and Orlando Sentinel.

Episodes 

Each episode of this season is named after a song.

Cast and characters

Main 
 Ellen Pompeo as Dr. Meredith Grey
 Sandra Oh as Dr. Cristina Yang
 Katherine Heigl as Dr. Izzie Stevens
 Justin Chambers as Dr. Alex Karev
 T. R. Knight as Dr. George O'Malley
 Chandra Wilson as Dr. Miranda Bailey
 James Pickens Jr. as Dr. Richard Webber
 Kate Walsh as Dr. Addison Montgomery-Shepherd
 Isaiah Washington as Dr. Preston Burke
 Patrick Dempsey as Dr. Derek Shepherd

Recurring 
 Sara Ramirez as Dr. Callie Torres
 Brooke Smith as Dr. Erica Hahn
 Kate Burton as Ellis Grey
 Steven W. Bailey as Joe, the Bartender
 Chris O'Donnell as Finn Dandridge
 Loretta Devine as Adele Webber
 Jeffrey Dean Morgan as Denny Duquette

Notable guests 
 Eric Dane as Dr. Mark Sloan
 Sarah Utterback as Olivia Harper
 Kali Rocha as Sydney Heron
 Tsai Chin as Helen Yang 
 Jeff Perry as Thatcher Grey
 Mare Winningham as Susan Grey
 Laurie Metcalf as Beatrice Carver
 Jillian Armenante as Mindy Carlson
 Brian Kerwin as Holden McKee
 Jesse Plemons as Jake Burton 
 Tessa Thompson as Camille Travis
 Monica Keena as Bonnie Crasnoff
 Kym Whitley as Yvonne
 Katherine LaNasa as Vera Kalpana 
 Cress Williams as Tucker Jones 
 Anjul Nigam as Dr. Raj Sen 
 Robin Pearson Rose as Patricia Murphy
 George Dzundza as Harold O'Malley
 Tim Griffin as Ronny O'Malley
 Greg Pitts as Jerry O'Malley
 Mary Kay Place as Olive Warner 
 Christina Ricci as Hannah Davies
 John Cho as Marshall Stone
 Mandy Siegfried as Molly Grey
 Kyle Chandler as Dylan Young

Production

Crew 
The season was produced by Touchstone Television, currently ABC Studios, in association with ShondaLand Production Company and The Mark Gordon Company. Shonda Rhimes returned as the series' showrunner and executive producer. She also continued her position from the first 2 seasons as one of the most prominent members of the writing staff. Betsy Beers, Mark Gordon, Mark Wilding, and Rob Corn returned as executive producers, along with James D. Parriott, Peter Horton, and Krista Vernoff, who have been in this position since the inception of the series. Parriott, who also served as an episodic writer, left the series at the conclusion of the season. Joan Rater and Tony Phelan continued to serve as co-executive producers, with Rater being a supervising producer as well. Stacy McKee, who would be promoted to co-executive producer for the third season, returned to the series as a producer and a member of the writing staff. Having written 3 episodes for the first season, Rhimes returned as a writer for 5 episodes. Parriott, Vernoff, Phelan, Rater, Wilding and Mimi Schmir were the most prominent members of the writing staff, with Parriott, Phelan, Rater, Wilding, Clack writing 2 episodes and Schmir producing the script for 3. Gabrielle Stanton and Harry Werksman, Jr. worked together for the writing of 2 episodes, after having written 1 episode for the series in the past. 

The season includes the first episode to be written by Zoanne Clack, who would become one of the series' main writers, as well as a co-producer and executive story editor. Other writers include Kip Koenig, Blythe Robe and Elizabeth Klaviter. Executive producer Peter Horton returned to the series to direct 5 episodes for the season, after writing 2 episodes in the second season. Rob Corn directed 2 episodes, whereas Adam Davidson is credited for writing 3 episodes, his last ones in the series. Among the other directors are Wendey Stanzler, Mark Tinker, Jeff Melman, Jessica Yu, Lesli Linka Glatter, Michael Dinner, Dan Minahan, David Paymer, Julie Anne Robinson, Tricia Brock, and Seith Mann. Danny Lux continued his position as the main music composer for the series, while Herbert Davis, Tim Suhrstedt and Adam Kane served as the season's cinematography directors. Susan Vaill and Edward Ornelas resumed their positions as editors, joined by Briana London, who left the series after 9 episodes. Linda Lowy and John Brace, responsible for the casting since the beginning of the series, returned as casting team members. After the departure of Laurence Bennett, the production design team was taken over by Donald Lee Harris, with Amy B. Ancona and Brandee Dell'Aringa joining for 10 episodes each.

The series' set decoration crew was led by Karen Bruck, whereas the costume design department was led by Linda M. Bass, who would leave the show at the conclusion of the season, following her being replaced by Mimi Melgaard. The make-up department was led by head Norman T. Leavitt, along with assistant make-up artist Brigitte Bugayong. The special make-up effects team consisted of Thomas R. Burman, Bari Dreiband-Burman and Bart Mixon. Arleen Chavez was the key hair stylist for the second season. Other makeup artists that contributed in the third season were Vincent Van Dyke, Allan Holt and Christopher Payne. The series production managers were unit production manager Carla Corwin and post-production supervisor Joy Ramos, who both depart from the series at the conclusion of the season, being replaced by unit production manager Jeff Rafner, production manager Chad Alber and production executive Tim Herbstrith. Second assistant directors since the inception of the series, Laura Petticord, Shawn Hanley and Chris Hayden returned to the series for the second season. The art department consisted of construction foreman Bob Huffman, set dressers Stacy Doran and Bruce Purcell, leadman Joseph W. Grafmuller, property master Angela M. Whiting, labor foreman Verne Hammond, art department coordinator Angela Trujillo, construction coordinator Curt Jones, set designer Yvonne Garnier-Hackl, stage foreman Tom Talley and paint foreman Alex Thompson. Joining the art department were set painter Shelley Adajian and assistant property masters Andrew Allen-King and Jeanne Bueche. However, the 3 new additions left the series after the production of the season finale, being temporarily replaced by Nicole Dome and T. Scott Elliott, who joined the team for 2 episodes. Sound editor Anthony Toretto, additional foley artist Mark McBryde, foley mixer Stacey Michaels, production sound mixer Brydon Baker III, foley artist Noel Vought, boom operator Kevin Maloney and sound re-recording mixers Todd Langer, Don Digirolamo, Pete Elia and Kurt Kassulke, the original members of the sound department, all returned for the second season. Production sound mixer Veda Campbell also returned, but departed after 4 episodes into the season, whereas assistant sound mixer Douglas J. Schulman was added to the crew for the first 10 episodes of the season. Joining the production team in the sound crew were boom operator Kevin Maloney, sound mixer Cameron Hamza, Robert Marts and Mick Davies, with both Marts and Davies leaving the show after 2 episodes. The special effects team, which was led by coordinator Jason Gustafson, consisted of make-up artists Anthony Julio, who had been part of the production crew since the beginning of the series, and special effects foreman Ken Rudell. Part of the visual effects team were computer graphic artist Richard Also, visual effects supervisor Rick Cortes and matte artist Kristin Johnson. Whereas Cortes and Johnson joined the crew close to the season finale, Also was the only member of the visual effects team to have been in the crew since the beginning of the series.

Writing and filming 

The season was primarily filmed in Los Angeles, California. Fisher Plaza, which is the headquarters building for the media company Fisher Communications and Fisher's ABC affiliated Komo radio and television stations for Seattle, is used for some exterior shots of Seattle Grace Mercy West Hospital, such as air ambulances landing on the Komo Television newscopter's helipad. This puts Seattle Grace conveniently close to the Space Needle, which is directly across the street from Fisher Plaza, the Seattle Monorail, and other local landmarks. However, the hospital used for most other exterior and many interior shots is not in Seattle, are shot at the VA Sepulveda Ambulatory Care Center in North Hills, California. Most scenes are primarily taped in Los Feliz, Los Angeles, at the Prospect Studios, and the set occupies two stages, including the hospital pieces, but some outside scenes are shot at the Warren G. Magnuson Park in Seattle. Several props used are genuine medical supplies, including the MRI machine. Prior to being cast, Sara Ramirez was seen by ABC executives, in her Broadway performance of Spamalot, which garnered their attention. Due to their admiration, the network offered Ramirez a role on any ABC television series, of her choice, which ultimately led in her choosing Grey's Anatomy. Ramirez further explained that at her initial audition, the producers liked her, and had intentions to add her to the show, but did not know whom to cast her as. She also said she was in awe of how the executives said, "Pick a show, any show!", a statement she deemed rare. Ramirez's character was given recurring status in the second season, having been conceived as a love-interest for George O'Malley. At Torres' initial appearance on the show, she was disliked by fans, due to her getting in the way of O'Malley and Grey's relationship. When asked of this, Ramirez said: "You do run across a lot of people who are extremely invested in that storyline. Obviously, I've heard some negative stuff." Discussing Izzie Stevens' relationship with Alex Karev, Katherine Heigl described her character as naive enough to believe she can save him, assessing that: "Even when Alex was a complete dirtbag to her, she forgave him and gave him another chance. And he really screwed her over." Writer Stacy McKee described Izzie's moving on from Alex to patient Denny Duquette as "karma", as Alex previously treated Izzie badly, yet as he begins to realize his true feelings, he is forced to watch her embark on a romance with Denny, regarded by her as "undeniably handsome and totally charming." Series writer Blythe Robe commented on Izzie and Denny: "I love the way Izzie lights up when she’s around him. I love their relationship because it's so pure and honest and completely game-free." Writer Elizabeth Klaviter noted at this time the way Izzie "seems to be sacrificing her reputation because of her feelings for Denny." When Izzie deliberately worsened Denny's condition to move him up the transplant list, series writer Mark Wilding questioned the morality of the actions, asking: "Is Izzie bad for doing it? Is she tremendously irresponsible? She cut the wire for love so does that make her action understandable?" Series creator Shonda Rhimes discussed costuming choices in the scene which saw the interns gather around Denny's deathbed, explaining: "Meredith and Cristina and Alex and George and Callie are all dressed, not for a prom, but for a funeral. Everyone in dark colors, everyone dressed somberly. As if they were in mourning. Only Izzie is in happy pink. Only Izzie looks like she didn't know this was coming."

Peter Horton, expressed that his plan of developing Chandra Wilson's character, Miranda Bailey, was to focus on the similarities between her and the actress, noting that "there's not a mean bone in her body, but she's solid and steady, like a rock." Wilson herself noted a significant evolution in her character's personality, noting a transition from the cold attitude that was characteristic to her in the past, to a maternal outlook on her interns. She also noted a number of similarities between her and her character, describing how considers Miranda Bailey an alter-ego of hers, rather than someone living inside her. Wilson also assessed that being a real-life human is what makes Bailey an appreciated character: "She gets to be flawed, she gets to be tired, she can be cranky, she can be grumpy." Showrunner Shonda Rhimes explained that the idea of Miranda Bailey having a child was developed after Chandra Wilson had already been pregnant for 6 months. Cast member Kate Walsh deemed Wilson's portrayal of her character "sweet and wonderful", naming her a professional: "She makes you be a better actor, just by being there." She also described her performance during her character's labor as "heart-breaking, tender, powerful and wonderful", noting how she managed to transform the strong character into "a weak woman, struggling to fight the unusual situation." Fellow cast member James Pickens, Jr. described Wilson's portrayal of Miranda Bailey as "a breath of fresh air, literally and figuratively", also noting how the force she delivers is mainly due to the start of her career being in theater. Horton also described the production process of the 2-part story arc, which he stated to have been planning since the beginning of the series. He stated that the plot of the episodes had to "fill the demands of the Super Bowl", which was scheduled to air in the same night: "We really wanted something different and Shonda [Rhimes] came up with the idea of this bomb, that we found simply outstanding!" Visual effects supervisor Scott Milnex noted how "breaking down the story boards was really the key to getting all the departments to work together." He also assessed that the necessity to use Primacord, an element they had been trying to avoid, for the explosion scene proved excessively dangerous, and was ultimately replaced with wood and clothing material. He described the filming process by emphasizing the transition from mannequin to the real actor: "When we filmed it, there was a moment, a fraction of a second, when we changed the body with the actor."

Casting 

The second season had 10 roles receiving star billing, out of whom 9 were returning from the first season. All the actors who appear as series-regulars portray physicians from the fictional Seattle Grace Hospital, specialized in surgery. Ellen Pompeo acted as Meredith Grey, the protagonist and the narrator of the series, a surgical intern who struggles to balance the difficulties of the competitive career she has chosen, with her troubled personal background. Sandra Oh portrayed highly competitive intern Cristina Yang, who suffers a miscarriage just as she starts accepting her upcoming motherhood. Katherine Heigl played intern Izzie Stevens, in a continuous struggle to be looked upon as a doctor, not the model she used to be. Justin Chambers acted as Alex Karev, who begins to develop an emotional side of his personality, after being introduced as arrogant and selfish. T. R. Knight played the role of intern George O'Malley, whose insecurity and lack of self-confidence evolve due to his unshared feelings for Meredith Grey. Chandra Wilson portrayed surgical resident and brilliant general surgeon Miranda Bailey, the mentor of the five interns, whose rudeness and cold attitude earns her the nickname "The Nazi." James Pickens, Jr. portrayed Seattle Grace Hospital's Chief of Surgery, Richard Webber, whose relationship with Meredith Grey's mother, which occurred 21 years ago, threatens to ruin his marriage. Isaiah Washington played the role of attending physician and cardiothoracic surgeon Preston Burke, who learns that Cristina, with whom he had a sexual relationship, is pregnant with his child. Patrick Dempsey portrayed attending neurosurgeon Derek Shepherd, whose relationship with intern Meredith Grey has been the focal point of the series since its inception. Although originally conceived as a guest-star with a 5-episode story arc, Kate Walsh decided to extend her contract following positive reviews from critics and fans, resulting in her getting promoted to series-regular status. Being the first addition to the original cast from the first season, Walsh began receiving star-billing in the seventh episode of the season, portraying obstetrician-gynaecologist and world-class neonatal surgeon Addison Montgomery Shepherd, who comes in Seattle seeking reconciliation with her estranged husband, Derek Shepherd.

Numerous supporting characters have been given expansive and recurring appearances in the progressive storyline. Sara Ramirez appeared in a 9-episode arc in the season, portraying orthopedic surgical resident Callie Torres, introduced and developed as a love-interest for the character of George O'Malley. Steven W. Bailey is introduced in the recurring role of Joe, the Bartender, often being portrayed as a confidant of the surgeons of Seattle Grace Hospital. Chris O'Donnell portrayed veterinary physician Finn Dandridge, who became a love-interest for Meredith Grey. Renowned surgeon Ellis Grey, Meredith's mother, who is suffering from Alzheimer's disease, continues her recurring role from the first season, being portrayed by Kate Burton. Brooke Smith portrayed Erica Hahn, a cardiothoracic surgeon at Seattle Presbyterian Hospital, who is revealed to have been a rival of Preston Burke ever since they attended medical school together. Jeffrey Dean Morgan appears in 6 episodes throughout the season, portraying patient Denny Duquette, who begins a relationship with Izzie Stevens, but ultimately dies following an unsuccessful heart transplant surgery. Loretta Devine acted as Adele Webber, Richard's wife, who is revealed to have been aware of her husband's affair since its inception. Other guest-stars include Sarah Utterback in the role of nurse Olivia Harper, love-interest of both George O'Malley and Alex Karev, Kali Rocha portraying fifth-year resident Sydney Heron, who replaces Miranda Bailey temporarily when she takes a maternity leave, Jeff Perry portraying Meredith Grey's father, Thatcher Grey, Mare Winningham in the role of Susan Grey, Tsai Chin in the role of Helen Yang Rubenstein, Cristina's mother, Mandy Siegfried portraying Molly Grey Thompson, Meredith's half-sister and Tessa Thompson portraying Camille Travis, Richard Webber's niece, Christina Ricci portraying paramedic Hannah Davies, and Kyle Chandler in the role of Dylan Young, head of the bomb squad. Eric Dane, who would be promoted to a series-regular in the third season, appeared in the eighteenth episode, portraying attending physician, otolaryngologist and plastic surgeon Mark Sloan, Addison Montgomery's former lover, whose affair with her is presented as the reason behind the estrangement of her husband, Derek Shepherd.

Reception

Ratings 
The first 5 episodes of the season were initially planned to be within the first season with the episode "Bring the Pain" as the season 1 finale. According to Rhimes, after airing the ninth episode of the show, the ratings, the time-slots and the really great audience meant that they have to end the season with that episode, and the cliffhanger with the coming of Derek's estranged wife fit perfectly. The season received high critical acclaim, and it performed better than the first season. Due to the success of the first season, Grey's Anatomy took over the Sunday night timeslot along with Desperate Housewives, replacing Boston Legal. The second season averaged 21.07 million viewers, making it the highest-rated season of the series to date. It was ranked #5 in the 2005-2006 television season. The season also includes the series' highest-rated episode, "It's the End of the World" which was watched by 37.88 million viewers.

Critical response 

The season opened up to high critical acclaim with many critics calling it "one of the best shows on TV" and was included in the top 10 for numerous "best of television" lists of 2006. Emily VanDerWerff of The A.V. Club called the show a "Pokémon" and "one of the best TV shows around, burning through plot points at a furious clip, swooning romanticism, at embracing the kind of deeply-earnest, intensely-felt romance that made the show’s relationships so great. Meredith’s famous "Pick Me, Choose Me, Love Me" speech is corny, to be sure, but it's got tremendous rhythm and absolute conviction... season 2 of Grey's was a comet." Todd Gilchrist of IGN Entertainment expressed hope in the further development of the series, noting the complex backgrounds of each character as being the series' focal-point. He noted that the ensemble, composed of "countless comely females and enough strong, competitive males" remains outstanding in primetime, being iconic, due to the vast interpretations regarding the main cast. Whereas Gilchrist acknowledged that the show gives the impression of it being only for women, he stated that he can attest to its universal, equal-opportunity appeal, assessing that the show "explores the medical world with both a sense of testosterone-fueled intensity and estrogen-laced sensitivity" and deserved to have viewers from both genders, championing its merits. In response to the bomb story-arc, he called the 2 episodes "juicy", while assessing that they "followed a storyline that not only explained the series up to that point, but featured all of the characters in their more-or-less purest from." Gilchrist provided an outlook on each character, describing Grey as a "prodigiously talented but insecure surgeon, waylaid by her love for attending Derek Shepherd", while stating that Yang, "an aggressively-ambitious intern" lacks knowledge on any topic, except medicine, comparing her to boyfriend Burke, described as her opposite. In response to George O'Malley's storyline, he noted how his sensitive personality constantly results in difficulty in his path to becoming a proper surgeon. He also expressed excitement in the doors opened by the previous season's cliffhanger, seeing the arrival of Montgomery (Walsh) as "certainly speaking to the show's focus on relationships over the nuts-and-bolts of being a surgeon", while praising Rhimes for continuing to "merge those disparate elements in the way that does, or at least should be a source of enthusiasm for both men and women, creating an atmosphere both professional and intimately personal, often at the same time."
 
Noting the realism in the writing for the series, Gilchrist stated: "It's as if Rhimes & Co. harnessed the sublime and the mundane of our daily experiences, that strange sense of drama that emerges from even the most unimportant daily conflicts, and it transported it on a world that is legitimately fraught with life-and-death decisions." However, he expressed disappointment in the end of the second season, which he deemed surprisingly less strong, compared to the "powerful" first-half and the "immaculate" first season, describing Stevens' "awkward and self-destructive" relationship with a patient as a way to "slow episodes to a screeching halt with maudlin and painfully-underdeveloped turns towards melodrama", while expressing the predictability of Duquette's death. Gilchrist stated in response to Stevens' development in the last part of the second season: "Izzie's descent into abject hysteria, which followed her season-long sanctimoniousness about everything, actually made me want something terrible to happen to her too." He described how some episodes were not among the show's strongest, noting that the some plot-lines created poignancy, and connected in an unfamiliar way.

The reviews have stood the test of time and the season still remains a huge critical favorite. Entertainment Weekly reviewing the tenth season of the show acknowledged that, "the second season is still the show’s best season to date." The site added, "I do want to talk about what season 10 could learn from what I believe is the show’s best season to date: season 2." calling in all the signature elements of the show that it did the best with listing all the best moments from the season, "the elevator", "the walkway", "Joe’s bar, " Meredith's "Pick Me" speech." and the "memorable patients" adding, " I want 2 people stuck on a pole ("Into You Like a Train") or 2 Amish best friends having to say goodbye, and I want those stories to be given ample time to resonate. More than anything, I want them to affect our doctors in heartbreaking and beautiful ways."

Eyder Peralta of The Houston Chronicle was critical of Izzie's ethics in cutting Denny's LVAD wire, writing that she "should not be practising medicine" and stating: "That's the reason I don't watch Grey's Anatomy, anymore, because the super-hot blond chick can make an earth-shattering, fatal decision and she doesn't get canned." Regarding the second season, Kevin Carr from 7M Pictures said "Rhimes really just put Scrubs, E.R., Sex and the City and even a dash of The Love Boat in a blender and poured out Grey's Anatomy." Also in regard to the second season, Christopher Monfette of IGN TV said "[...] The second season of this medical drama expertly wove its signature elements of complex relationships, whimsical banter and challenging life-lessons - all to a montage-fetish, indie-rock soundtrack."

Accolades 

In 2006, the series won the Golden Globe for Best Drama Series. Sandra Oh won the 2005 Golden Globe for Best Supporting Actress in a Series, Miniseries, or TV Film and the 2006 Screen Actors Guild Award for Outstanding Performance by a Female Actor in a Drama Series for her portrayal of Cristina Yang in the show's second season. Ellen Pompeo and Patrick Dempsey were also nominated for the Best Actress in a Drama Series and Best Actor in a Drama Series respectively at the 63rd Golden Globe Awards. In 2006, casting directors Linda Lowy and John Brace won the Primetime Emmy Award Outstanding Casting for a Drama Series. The Grey's Anatomy cast won Best Ensemble in a Television Series at the 2006 Satellite Awards. At the Screen Actors Guild Awards, the cast was nominated for Outstanding Performance by an Ensemble in a Drama Series. Isaiah Washington was awarded Outstanding Actor in a Drama Series at the NAACP Image Awards in 2006. Krista Vernoff received an Primetime Emmy Award for Outstanding Writing for a Drama Series nomination for the sixth episode of the season. The sixteenth and seventeenth episodes of the season secured writer Shonda Rhimes a nomination for the Primetime Emmy Award for Outstanding Writing for a Drama Series in 2006.

DVD release 
The second season was officially released on DVD in Region 1 on September 12, 2006, almost 2 weeks before the third season premiere which aired on September 21, 2006. Under the title Grey's Anatomy: The Complete Second Season – Uncut, the box-set consists of episodes with Dolby Digital 5.1 surround sound and widescreen format. It also contained extras available only on DVD, including extended episodes, interviews with cast and crew members, footage from behind-the-scenes and unaired scenes cut from the aired episodes. The same set was released in Region 4 on January 10, 2007, 4 months after its original release in the United States, whereas its first release date in Region 2 was May 28, 2007, being made available first in the United Kingdom. The UK set contained the last 22 episodes of the season, due to the first 5 being released on the first season DVD.

References

External links 
 

2005 American television seasons
2006 American television seasons
Grey's Anatomy seasons